Nethi Dhiyayas is a Maldivian docudrama series developed for Television Maldives by Mohamed Shareef. Produced by Television Maldived, the series stars Ismail Rasheed, Mohamed Manik, Aminath Rasheedha and Roanu Hassan Manik in pivotal roles. The story narrates the true incidents of a young man who recovered from drug addiction.

Cast

Main
 Ismail Rasheed as Nasir
 Ali Iufaaf Ismail as young Nasir
 Roanu Hassan Manik as Anwar
 Aminath Rasheedha as Rasheedha
 Ahmed Saeed as Hampe
 Khadheeja Mohamed as Thahumeena

Recurring
 Mohamed Manik as Asim
 Hussain Shibau as Boney
 Ibrahim Usman
 Mariyam Afeefa as Reena

Guest
 Naashidha Mohamed as Shaira
 Ali Waheed
 Ahmed Hassan
 Ahmed Ziya as a customer (Episode 4)

Episodes

Soundtrack

Response
Upon release, the series was applauded by critics and audience for its moral values and being a medium of awareness for drug addiction.

Accolades

References

External links 
 

Serial drama television series
Maldivian television shows